Zoya Tsopei Sheikh is a Turkish-Greek Singer Actress, TV show producer and Director. She born in Greece become a part of Greek Music Industry and cinema Greece of 2020 at age of 21. She is granddaughter of Corinna Tsopei, She won award for best female pop singer Latvia 2021.

Career 
Zoya started her career as a fashion model in April 2019, later she started her singing career in December 2020.

References

External links 

 Zoya Tsopei Sheikh at IMDb
 Zoya Tsopei Sheikh on Instagram

Actresses from Athens
Year of birth missing (living people)
Living people